Prince Gleb Vladimirovich of Ryazan was a 13th-century nobleman of Kievan Rus'. He is remembered in history as an instigator of a civil war in the Principality of Ryazan. In a bid for the throne, in 1217 he lured his brothers to a feast and executed them all, using Cuman mercenaries. Ousted by popular revolt, he was exiled to the Wild Fields and spent his old days with the Cumans.

He is a minor antagonist (and a Tatar-collaborator) during the Mongol invasion of Rus' in the historical novel Batu-Khan of Soviet author V. Jan.

References 

Kievan Rus' royalty